Halnaker Windmill is a tower mill which stands on Halnaker Hill, northeast of Chichester, Sussex, England. The mill is reached by a public footpath from the north end of Halnaker, where a track follows the line of Stane Street before turning west to the hilltop.  There is no machinery in the brick tower.

History
Halnaker Mill was first mentioned in 1540 as belonging to the manor of "Halfnaked". It was built for the  Duke of Richmond as the feudal mill of the Goodwood Estate. The surviving mill is thought to date from the 1740s and is known to have been standing c.1780. Halnaker Mill was working until struck by lightning in 1905, damaging the sails and windshaft. The derelict mill was restored in 1934 by Neve's, the Heathfield millwrights as a memorial to the wife of Sir William Bird. Further repair work was done in 1954 by E Hole and Sons, The Burgess Hill millwrights. The mill was again restored in  2004. The mill is owned by West Sussex County Council.

Description

Halnaker Mill is a four-storey tower mill with a sixteen-sided beehive cap. The mill was originally hand wound, and later fitted with a fantail, which was not replicated when the mill was restored. The four common sails were originally carried on a wooden windshaft, which was damaged by a 1905 lightning strike. A cast-iron windshaft and wooden brake wheel from a wind sawmill at Punnetts Town were fitted. The windshaft is cast in two pieces, bolted together and was too short for Halnaker Mill. Neve's inserted a spacer to lengthen it. The mill worked two pairs of overdrift millstones.

Millers

John Hervey 1810
Charles Adams 1839–1870
G R Watkins 1868–1905

Hilaire Belloc
Halnaker Mill (or Ha'nacker Mill, reflecting the true pronunciation) is the subject of a poem by the English writer Hilaire Belloc in which the collapse of the mill is used as a metaphor for the tragic decay of the prevailing moral and social system.

There are musical settings of this poem by Peter Warlock and Ivor Gurney amongst others.

References

Further reading
 Online version

External links
 West Sussex County Council Halnaker Windmill on WSCC website.
 Windmill World page on Halnaker Windmill.
 Flickr Photographs of Halnaker Windmill on Flickr.

Commercial buildings completed in the 18th century
Windmills in West Sussex
Tower mills in the United Kingdom
Monuments and memorials in West Sussex